X500 is a 2016 drama film directed by Juan Andrés Arango. An international co-production between Canada, Colombia and Mexico, the film premiered in the Contemporary World Cinema strand at the 2016 Toronto International Film Festival.

The film tells the thematically interrelated but dramatically separate stories of three young adults, one each in Canada, Colombia and Mexico, who are each struggling to adapt to a new and unfamiliar living situation. The film features dialogue in English, French, Spanish, Tagalog and Mazahua.

The film stars Jembie Almazan as Maria, Bernardo Garnica Cruz as David and Jonathan Diaz Angulo as Alex.

References

External links
 

2016 films
2016 drama films
Canadian drama films
Colombian drama films
Mexican drama films
Films directed by Juan Andrés Arango
2010s Canadian films
2010s Mexican films
2010s Colombian films